The 2011 Northern Iowa Panthers football team represented the University of Northern Iowa in the 2011 NCAA Division I FCS football season. The Panthers were coached by Mark Farley and played their home games at the UNI-Dome. They are members of the Missouri Valley Football Conference. They finished the season 10–3, 7–1 in MVFC play to share the conference championship with North Dakota State. They received an at-large bid into the FCS playoffs where they defeated Wofford in the second round before falling to Montana in the quarterfinals.

L. J. Fort was named MVFC defensive player of the year.

Schedule

Game summaries

Game 1: vs. Iowa State Cyclones

Personnel

Roster
2011 Roster

Coaching staff

Rankings

References

Northern Iowa
Northern Iowa Panthers football seasons
Missouri Valley Football Conference champion seasons
Northern Iowa
Northern Iowa Panthers football